The Driver is a British crime drama television serial, set in Manchester, which aired on BBC One between September 23 and October 7, 2014. Written by Danny Brocklehurst, the three-part drama series stars David Morrissey and was directed by Jamie Payne. The serial was announced by BBC One on 10 January 2014 after it was commissioned by heads of drama Charlotte Moore and Ben Stephenson. Filming began in January 2014. The series was co-produced by Highfield Pictures and Red Production Company.

Cast

Main characters
 David Morrissey as Vince McKee
 Claudie Blakley as Rosalind McKee
 Sacha Parkinson as Katie McKee
 Ian Hart as Craig Vine/Colin Vine
 Darren Morfitt as Mickey Watson
 Lee Ross as Kev Mitchell
 Chris Coghill as Lee "Woodsy" Wood
 Lewis Rainer as Tim McKee
 Harish Patel as Amjad Kapoor
 Colm Meaney as The Horse

Other characters
 Rick Bacon as Issac Holmes
 Paul Hilton as Blake Bill
 Leanne Best as Sarah Hawthorne
 Shaun Dingwall as Detective James Ryder
 Andrew Knott as Detective Richard O'Connor
 Tom Gibbons as Ryan Short
 Nathan McMullen as Joseph Paslowski 
 Saira Choudhry as Tasha Morton
 Lee Toomes as Mr. Reynolds
 Chloe Harris as Jess Wallis
 Julian Walsh as Martin Webb
 Karl Collins as Greg Tyler 
 Alan Rothwell as Reg Watson
 Kaye Wragg as Melinda Baker
 Ciara Baxendale as Amanda Parkinson
 Judith Hershy as Donna Jackson
 Dominic Coleman as Matthew Benson
 Eve Steele as Cathy Ellis

Episodes

American adaptation

In March 2022, AMC announced an American adaptation of the series starring Giancarlo Esposito, which is set to premiere in 2023 with a six-episode first season. It will co-produced by AMC Studios, A+E Studios and Thruline Entertainment with Theo Travers as showrunner.

References

External links

2014 British television series debuts
2014 British television series endings
2010s British crime drama television series
BBC crime drama television shows
English-language television shows
Serial drama television series
Television series by Red Production Company
Television shows set in Manchester
Works about taxis